The following is a list of British almshouses:

England

Bedfordshire
Bedford Almshouses, Bedford

Berkshire

 
 Andrew's Almshouses, also known as the Widow's House, Speenhamland
 Westende Almshouses, Wokingham
 Dixon's Almshouses, Aldermaston
 Donnington Hospital, Bucklebury & Iffley, Oxon
 Horsemoor Green almshouses, Langley Marish
 Jesus Hospital, Bray
 John Isbury's Almshouses, Lambourn
 Place's or Jacob Hardrett's Almshouses, Lambourn
 The Haven of Rest Almshouses, Maidenhead
 St Mary's Almshouses, Newbury
 Pearces Almshouses, Newbury
 Old Hunt's Almshouses, Newbury
 Coxedd's Almshouses, Newbury
 Newbury Church & Almshouse Charity Almshouses, Newbury (Newtown Road & Harvest Green)
 Kimber's Almshouses, Newbury
 Raymond's Almshouses, Newbury
 Essex Wynter Almshouses, Newbury
 Mabel Luke Almshouses, Newbury
 Robinson's Almshouses, Newbury
 St Bartholomew's Hospital, also known as King John's Almshouses, Newbury
 St Peter's Almshouses, Brimpton
 Seymour Almshouses, Langley Marish
 Vachel Almshouses, Reading

Bristol

 Colstons Almshouses (built 1691)
 Dr White's Almshouse (founded 1613)
 Foster's Almshouses (founded 1482), Colston Street (former almshouses) 
 Bengough's Almshouses, Horfield Road
 Haberfield House, Hotwell Road
 Hill's Almshouses (now Stoneleigh House), Jacob's Wells Road
 Merchant Taylors' Almshouses, (Worshipful Company of Merchant Taylors) Merchant Street (1701)
 Merchant Venturers Almshouses (built c.1696)
 Holy Trinity Almshouses, Old Market Street
 Perry's Almshouses, Dragon Road, Winterbourne
 St Ambrose Almshouses, Park Crescent
 St Monica's Home of Rest, (Merchant Venturers Almshouses) Cote Lane (1925)
 St Nicholas's Almshouses (built 1652–1656)

Buckinghamshire
 The Almshouse Charity of Sir Ralph Verney (1st Bt d. 1696), Middle Claydon, Buckingham, Buckinghamshire (1654)
 The Bishop King's Almshouses, Worminghall (1670)
 Christ's Hospital, Buckingham
 Miss Day's Almhouses, Amersham
 Lady Dodd's Cottages, Ellesborough
 Thomas Hickman's Almshouses, Aylesbury (1695)
 Weedon's Almshouses, Chesham
 Sir William Drake's Almhouse, Amersham
Dormer Almshouses (Hospital), Wing (misdated as 1569)
Winwood Almshouses, Quainton (1687)
Stafford Almshouse, Shenley (1654)
Revis Almshouses, Newport Pagnell (1755)
Alice Carter's Almshouse, Brill (1591)
Dormer Almshouses, Hughendon 
Finch Almshouses, Ravenstone
Ann Hopkins Smith Almshouses, Olney (1819)
Goodwin Almshouses, Waddesdon
St Scholastica's Retreat, Princes Risborough (founded in 1861 at Clapton, moved to Princes Risborough 1972)

Cambridgeshire

 Burberry Homes, Buckden
 Hospital of St. Anthony and St. Eligius known as Spital House a new-build, Cambridge
 Countess of Hardwicke Almshouses, Arrington
 Jakenett's Almshouses, Cambridge
 John Street Almshouses, Cambridge (new-build)
 Jenyns House, March Almshouse and Pension Charity, March
 Kings Street Almshouses, Cambridge
 Lady Peyton's Almshouses, Isleham
 Mansfield Almshouses, Chesterton, Cambridge
 Moretons Charity Almhouses, Cottenham (built 1853)
 Parsons Almshouses, Ely
 Perse Almshouses, Cambridge
 Pilgrim's Rest Almshouses, St Ives
 South's Almshouses, Buckden (built 1850)
 St John's Almshouses, Huntingdon, (built 1847)
 Storey's Almshouses, Mount Pleasant, Cambridge
The Cambridge Royal Albert Homes, Cambridge

Cheshire

Crewe Almshouses, Nantwich (built 1767)
 Dixons Almshouses, Listed buildings in Christleton
Harriet Hope Almshouses, Crewe Almshouses, Nantwichhe
 Hospital of St Lawrence, Acton
 Lumley Place Almshouses, Grade II listed buildings in Chester (east)
 Nine Houses, Chester, Park Street, only six remain
Tollemache Almshouses, Nantwich (built 1870)
Widows' Almshouses, Nantwich
Wilbraham's Almshouses, Acton (built 1613)
Wilbraham's Almshouses, Nantwich
Wood and Garnett Almshouses, Nantwich
Wood and Garnett Almshouses, Willaston
Wright's Almshouses, Nantwich (built 1638)

Cornwall

 Almshouses, St. Stephen in St. Stephen Brannel
 Buller Almshouses, Barker’s Hill, Saltash
 Earle’s Retreat, Trelawney Road, Falmouth
 Fowey Almshouses, 1 Cobb’s Well, Fowey
 Hugh Boscawen Almshouses, Tregony Hill, Tregony
 Kensey Place, Dockacre Road, Launceston
 Maids House, Quethiock
 Morval Almshouses, Morval
 Mr Lanyon’s Almshouses, Halvarras Road, Kea
 Padstow Almshouses, Middle Street, Padstow
 Poads Trust Almshouses, Menheniot
 Rashleigh Almshouses, Polmear Hill, Polmear
 Sir William Moyle’s Almshouses, Gallery Lane, St Germans

Cumbria
 St Anne's Hospital, Appleby-in-Westmorland
 Sandes Hospital Cottages in Kendal, 1663.

Derbyshire

 Chandos Pole House, Church Street, Barlborough, registered as Barlborough Hospital
 Clergy Widows' Almshouses, also known as Spalden's Almshouses, School Lane, Ashbourne
 Cooper's Almshouses, 1–11 Derby Road, Ashbourne
 London Road Almshouses, Derby
 Matthew Smiths Almshouses, Belper
 Owlfield and Pegge's Almshouses, Ashbourne
 Thomas Cook Almshouses, Melbourne

Devon

 Almshouses, New Street, Great Torrington
 Burrough's Almshouses, Church Lane, Broadclyst
 Dartmouth United Charities Almshouses, Dartmouth
 Colmer Almshouses, Ford
 Cockington Almshouses, Cockington Lane, Cockington
 Gilberd's Almshouses, Old Exeter Road, Newton Abbot (new build)
 John Greenway Gardens, Gold Street, Tiverton
 Lady Lucy Reynell's Clergy Widows' Houses, Torquay Road, Newton Abbot
 Mackrell's Almshouses, Wolborough Street, Newton Abbot
 Penrose's Almshouses, Lichdon Street, Barnstaple, built by Richard Beaple
 Robert Hayman Almshouses, East Street, Newton Abbot
 Salem Almshouses, Trinity Street, Barnstaple
 Spurways Almshouses, Park Street, Crediton
 Strange & Armory Almshouses, Bridge Plats Way, Londonderry, Bideford (new build)
 St Catherine's Almshouses and Chapel, Catherine Street, Exeter (ruins - founded by Canon John Stevens DD Doctor of Physick in 1457 to house 13 poor men)

Dorset

 Barnes Homes Almhouses, Blandford Forum
 Ryves Almshouses, Blandford Forum
 Daniel Taylors Almshouses, Bridport
 South Street Almshouse Bridport
 Magdalen Almshouses Bridport
 Dorchester Municipal Charities, Dorchester
 Tregonwell Almshouses, Milton Abbas
 St George's Almshouses, Poole
 Shaftesbury Municipal Almshouse Charity, Shaftesbury
 St Johns' House, Sherborne
 Sir Anthony Ashley's Almshouses, Wimborne Minster 
 Stretche's Almshouses, Wareham

Durham

 Durham Aged Mineworkers Homes Association Chester-le-Street
 Jacob Wright Cottages, Evenwood
 William Russell Bequest, Brancepeth
 Fox Almshouses, Norton, Stockton-on-Tees
 Trinity Gardens Almshouses, Stockton-on-Tees
 St. John of God (Stitchell House), Greatham

Essex
 Barfield's Almshouses, Dedham
 Barker's Almshouses, Dedham
 Dunton's Almshouses, Dedham
 John Henry Keene Memorial Homes, Chelmsford
 Shen Place Almshouses, Shenfield
 Sir William Petre Almshouses, Ingatestone
 South Weald Almshouses, South Weald
 Fuller House (The Almshouses), Church Road, Stansted Mountfitchet

Gloucestershire
 Almshouses, Great Badminton 
 Christopher & Sarah Bowley's Almshouses, Tetbury
 Newlands almshouses, Newlands
 Perry & Dawes Almshouses, Wotton-under-Edge
 St Lawrence's Almshouses, Cirencester
 The Gorse Almshouses, Coleford

Hampshire
 Deane's Almshouses, Basingstoke: see Grade II* listed buildings in Basingstoke and Deane
 Forbes Almshouses, East Meon
 Geffery's House, Hook
 Thorner's Homes, Southampton: founded by Robert Thorner in his Will of 1690, the first almshouses opened in 1793, after much arguing with the trustees of the time, over other gifts in his Will, such as to Harvard College. The charity houses poor widows and single women of limited financial means over 55 years of age.
 Hospital of St Cross, Winchester: said to be the oldest charitable institution in England. Founded by Henry of Blois, Bishop of Winchester, in 1136. Home for 25 elderly men, known as Brothers, under a Master. They belong to the Order of the Hospital of St Cross founded c.1132 and wear black trencher hats and robes with silver Jerusalem cross badge. The Order of Noble Poverty, founded 1445, wear claret trencher hats and robes with silver cardinal's badge in memory of Cardinal Beaufort.

Herefordshire
 Coningsby Hospital 
 Duppa's Almshouses, Pembridge, which are Grade II listed
 The Lazarus Hospital
 Lingen Hospital
 Saint Ethelbert's Hospital
 Saint Giles' Hospital
 Williams' Hospital, Hereford (built 1601)
 Prices Almshouses
 Aubrey's Almshouses
 Rudhall Almshouses, Ross-on-Wye

Hertfordshire

 Baish Almshouses, Stanstead Abbots
 Buntingford almshouses, Buntingford
 Harrison Almshouses, Ware
 Monson Almshouses, Broxbourne
 St Mary's Almshouses, Ware
 Bedford Almshouses (Harpur Trust), Bedford
 Bedford Almshouses, Watford
 Warners Almshouses, Hitchin
 Sayer Almshouses, High Street, Berkhamsted
 Skynner's Almshouses, Hitchin
 The Cloisters, Radcliffe Rd, Hitchin
 Wynn Almshouses, Baldock

Isle of Wight
 Hopsley's Almshouses, Crocker Street, Newport

Kent

 Charles Amherst Almshouses, Royal Tunbridge Wells
 Cutbush & Corrall Charity, Maidstone and Harrietsham
 Eastbridge Hospital of St Thomas the Martyr, Canterbury, which is a Grade I listed
 Faversham Almshouses
 Foord Almshouses, Borstal
 French Hospital (La Providence), Rochester (founded in 1718)
 Gartley Cottages, Dartford
 Hayward's Almshouses, Rochester
 The Hospital of Sir John Hawkins, Knight, Chatham (founded in 1594)
 John & Ann Smiths's Hospital, Canterbury
 Loam Court, Dartford
 Manwood Almshouses, Canterbury
 Municipal Charities of Dover
 Nuckell's Almshouse, St. Peters, Broadstairs
 The Retreat, Sevenoaks
 Richard Watts Almshouses, Rochester (founded 1579)
 St. Catherine's Hospital, Rochester (founded 1315)
 St John's Hospital, Northgate, Canterbury (1084)
 St. Thomas Almshouses, Gravesend
 Trinity Court Almshouses, Aylesford
 Twisleton Almshouses, Dartford
 New College Almshouse, Cobham, Kent (built 1362, founded by Sir John de Cobham, based on a medieval chantry, partly rebuilt 1598 and occupied by elderly of the parish)
 Wrott and Hill Charity, Sutton-at-Hone

Lancashire

 Bank Top Almshouses, Blackburn
 Hartley Homes in Laneshawbridge, Colne 
 John Brabin's Almshouses, Chipping
 Lathom House Almshouses, Lathom
 Nancy Derbyshire Almshouses, Blackburn
 Stydd Almshouses, Ribchester
 The Penny Almshouses, Lancaster

Leicestershire
 
 Bede House (or Maison Dieu), Burton Street founded in 1640 by Robert Hudson (created a baronet by Charles II) and remodelled in 1875, Melton Mowbray
 Lyddington Bede House (originally Bishop's Palace, sold at Reformation as town house and then became a almshouse – building open and run by English Heritage), Lyddington
 Misses Moore’s Almshouses, Appleby Magna, built in 1839
 Powell & Welch Almshouse Charity Bitteswell
 Ravenstone Court, Coalville
 Trinity Hospital Almshouses, The Newarke, Leicester
 Wyggeston's Hospital, Leicester see William Wyggeston

Lincolnshire
 Bede Houses, Louth
 Orme Almshouses, Louth
 Bede Houses, Tattershall
 Browne's Hospital, Stamford, founded in 1485 and now Grade II* listed.
 Dawson's Almshouses, Grantham
 Fryer's Hospital, Stamford
 Lord Burghley's Almshouse, Stamford, founded 1597 to house 13 old men, one of whom was to serve as warden. Founded on site of the Medieval Hospital of St John the Baptist and St Thomas the Martyr which was founded c 1190 under Peterborough Abbey for the use of pilgrims and the poor.  In disuse by the c16 when only the chapel continued in use.  Bought in 1549 by William Cecil, Lord Burghley.  
 St Peter's Callis, Stamford
 Snowden's Hospital, Stamford
 Truesdale's Hospital, Stamford
 Williamson's Hospital, Stamford
 Hopkin's Hospital, Stamford
 The Spalding Town Husbands, over forty properties across the town, many new-builds, run by one charitable organisation
Long Sutton Consolidated

Greater London

Barnet

 Jesus Hospital is a charity administering over one hundred almshouses in the Barnet area.
 Lawrence Campe Almshouses, Whetstone, built around 1612 and funded by Lawrence Campe, a draper's merchant in the City of London 
 Leathersellers' Close, Barnet set up by the Worshipful Company of Leathersellers
 Wilbraham Almshouses, Barnet (founded 1616)

Bexley
 Styleman's Almshouses (built in 1755)

Bromley

 Free Watermen and Lightermen's Almshouses, also known as Royal Watermen's Almshouses,  Beckenham Road / Penge High Street, Penge
 former Sir Robert Geffyre Almshouses, Mottingham

Camden

 Greenwoods Almshouses, Camden
 St Giles in the Fields Almshouses, Covent Garden
 St Pancras Almshouses

Chelsea
 Royal Chelsea Hospital, retirement & nursing home established in 1682 by Charles II for 300 veterans of the British Army

Croydon
 Whitgift Almshouses, Whitgift Foundation, Croydon

Enfield
 Wright's Almshouses, Enfield

Greenwich

 Penns Almshouses, South Street, Greenwich
 Thomas Philipot's Almshouses, Eltham
 Trinity Hospital

Hackney
 former Geffrye almshouses, Hoxton, now the Geffrye Museum

Hammersmith and Fulham

Sir William Powell's Almshouses, at Church Gate, Fulham, built in 1869 and Grade II* listed
St Joseph's Almshouses, Brook Green; built in 1851 and Grade II listed

Haringey
 Drapers' Almshouses, Bruce Grove, Tottenham
 Forster's Almshouses, Tottenham
 Fullers Almshouses, Wood Green

Hounslow

 Butler’s Almshouses, Byfield Road, Isleworth
 Farnell’s Almshouses, St John’s Road, Isleworth
  Hopkin Morris Homes of Rest, Strand-on-the-Green, Chiswick
 Ingram’s Almshouses, Mill Plat, Isleworth
 Sermon's Almshouses, Twickenham Road, Isleworth

Kingston upon Thames
 Cleaves Almshouses, Kingston upon Thames (founded in 1550)

Lambeth
 Caron's Almshouses, Fentiman Road, SW8
 City of London Almshouses (Gresham Almshouses), Ferndale Road, Brixton
 Thrale Almshouses, Streatham
 Trinity Homes (Bailey's Almshouses), Acre Lane, Brixton

Lewisham
 Merchant Taylors' Boone's Charity, Boone's Chapel built 1683

Merton
 Mary Tate's Almshouses, Mitcham

Richmond upon Thames
 Benn's Walk, Richmond, built in 1983. They were built on the site of Benn's Cottages, which had been developed on land endowed by William Smithet in 1727 to the charity that was then administering Michel's Almshouses.
 Bishop Duppa's Almshouses, Richmond, founded by Brian Duppa, Bishop of Winchester, in 1661  and now Grade II listed. 
 Candler Almshouses, Twickenham were built in 1936 and are named after William Candler, a local grocer who left money to build them.
 Church Estate Almshouses, Richmond; Grade II listed. Most of the buildings date from 1843 but the charity that built them is known to have existed in Queen Elizabeth I's time and may have much earlier origins.
 Hickey's Almshouses, Richmond. Twenty almshouses,  built in 1834, are Grade II* listed.  A later block of almshouses, built in 1851 in the same style, is listed at Grade II. 
 Houblon's Almshouses, Richmond; Grade II* listed. The oldest almshouses were built in 1757; a further two almshouses were built in 1857.
 10–18 Manning Place, Richmond. The property was built in 1993 and was purchased in 2017 by The Richmond Charities for use as almshouses.
 Michel's Almshouses, Richmond; Grade II listed.  The original ten almshouses were built in 1696 and were rebuilt in 1811. Another six almshouses were added in 1858.
 Queen Elizabeth's Almshouses, Richmond, founded in 1600. They were rebuilt in 1767 and again in 1857. They were damaged during World War II and replaced with four newly built houses in 1955.
 Tollemache Almshouses, Ham, founded in 1892.

Southwark
 Edward Allyn's Almshouses, Old College, Dulwich
 Hopton's Almshouses, Bankside
 Draper Almshouses, Glasshill Street

Tower Hamlets
 Norton Folgate Almshouses, Spitalfields
 Trinity Green Almshouses, Mile End

Wandsworth

 Abraham Dawes Almshouses, Putney
 Dovedale Cottages, Battersea
 St Clement Danes Holborn Estate Almshouses and Chapel, Tooting

Westminster

 Westminster Almshouses, Rochester Row

Norfolk

 Fulmerston's Almshouses, Thetford
 Great Hospital, Norwich (founded 1249)
 Trinity Hospital, Castle Rising, King's Lynn

Northamptonshire

 Almshouses, Church Brampton (built in 1854 by Earl Spencer in memory of his parents, for six poor widows)
 Bede House, Higham Ferrers (built in 1423 by Archbishop Henry Chichele, for 12 men and one woman to look after them)
 Sawyers Almshouses, Sheep Street, Kettering (built in 1688)
 Raynesford Almshouses, 1–4 Church Street, Dallington, Northampton (founded 1673 by Richard Raynsford, a lawyer who became Chief Justice of the King's Bench under Charles II and lived at the manor house, buried in the church,)
 Jesus Hospital, Hospital Hill (off Market Square), Rothwell (built in 1593 by Owen Ragsdale, schoolmaster of the grammar school (which was on the site of the library and closed in the 1970s), for 24 Almsmen and a Principal, still an almshouse but with 2 three storey extensions built in 1830s.  The original building now has four larger flats, the extensions have six small flats, there is also a Warden's house (late c18) and opposite the Matron's cottage (1840) which is rented out.  The trust also owns the adjoining building, Home Farm, and the car park area outside which adjoins Market Square)
 Ponder's Almshouses, possibly the row of six houses on Glendon Road, opposite Ponder Street or where the bungalows on Ponder Street are now, Rothwell, Northamptonshire  – 6 small tenements erected in or about 1714 by Thomas Ponder and three roods of land adjoining for poor widows of Rothwell
 Almshouses, Wellingborough Road, Rushden (built in 1883 in memory of Frederick Maitland Sartoris by his father)
 Pickering Hospital, 6 cottages erected and endowed for support of 8 poor persons with preference for spinsters or widows Almshouses, Titchmarsh (dating from 1756)
 former Montague Hospital, Stamford Road, Weekley (dated 1611: now a private house, used as Mr Collin's Vicarage in Keira Knightley's Film "Pride & Prejudice")
 Almshouses, Creaton (dating from 1825 and rebuilt in 1897)
 The Hospital of St John Baptist and St John Evangelist (aka St John's Hospital), Bridge Street, Northampton (founded circa 1140), sold in 1870 to a Mr Mullinger who gave it to Roman Catholic Church.  Refounded 1876 at Weston Favell as a convalescent hospital and is now a restaurant.
 St Thomas' Hospital Building, 74 St Giles Street, Northampton (founded 1450), on site of what is currently the Plough Hotel, for 12 poor people.  In 1654 Sir John Langham funded an additional 6 people and Richard Massingberd another 1.  Building abandoned 1834, demolished in 1874 during road widening for the new cattle market and its residents moved to a new building on St Giles Street.  The new almshouse with distinctive castellations and stucco 2 storey front built in 1834.  In addition is plaque remembering the important charity own, and still own, the whole block above 39 St Giles Street.
 1–6 Crick Road, West Haddon (built 1870 for retired people from West Haddon)

Nottinghamshire

 Albert Ball Memorial Homes, Lenton, Nottingham
 Old School and Almshouses, Bunny (built in 1700)
 Almshouses, Main Street, Grove
 Almshouses, Perlethorpe cum Budby (built c. 1890)
 Almshouses, West Bridgford
 Dorothy Boot Homes, Wilford, Nottingham
 The United Charities of Abel Collin, Beeston
 The Brunts Charity, Toothill Lane/Leeming Street, Mansfield
 Frances Longden Almshouses, Bramcote
 Willoughby Almshouses, Cossall: erected in 1685
 Sloswicke's Hospital, Churchgate, East Retford
 Holy Trinity Hospital, Hospital Road, West Retford
 Heath's Hospital, Mansfield
 Plumptre Hospital, Nottingham (founded in 1392) 
 Canning Terrace, Canning Circus, Nottingham
 William Woodsend Memorial Homes, Nottingham
 Miss Cullen's Almshouses, Carrington, Nottingham
 George Wills Almshouses, Clifton, Nottingham
 Daybrook Almshouses, Arnold, Nottingham
 Mary Hardstaff Homes, Gedling, Nottingham
 Norris Almshouses, Sherwood, Nottingham
 Winnings Almshouses, Welbeck Abbey, Worksop

Oxfordshire

 Angier's Almshouses, Wallingford
 Almshouse of Robert Stiles, Wantage
 Bread & Beef Almshouses, Witney
 Castle's Almshouses, Guildenford
 Christ's Hospital, Abingdon
 Drayton Almshouses, Drayton
 Ewelme Hospital
 Geering's Alsmhouses, Harwell
 Goring Heath Almshouses, Goring Heath
 Holloway's Almshouses, Witney
 Longland Almshouses, Henley-on-Thames
 Newberry Almshouses, Henley-on-Thames
 Dr. Radcliffe's Almhouses, Steeple Aston
 Stones Court, City of Oxford
 Tomkins Almshouses, Abingdon
 Town Lands Of Wantage, Wantage
 Twitty's Almshouses, Abingdon
 Warwick Almshouses, Burford

Shropshire
 Almshouses, Sheinston Street, Much Wenlock
 Cludde Almshouses, 12 The Avenue, Wrockwardine (now private houses)
 Ercall Magna Almshouses, Shrewsbury Road, Ercall Magna
 Foxes Almshouses and Hosier's Almshouses, together managed as Hoysers in Ludlow
 Mercers' Almshouses, Shrewsbury
 Millington's Hospital, Shrewsbury, architect John Hiram Haycock
 St Leonard's, Bridgnorth
 Shrewsbury Drapers Company almshouses, Shrewsbury
 Town Almshouses, Newport
 Weston Park Almshouses, Weston Park, Weston-under-Lizard

Somerset

 Almshouses, Minehead
 Almshouses, Shepton Mallet
 Blue House, Frome, built in 1726 and Grade I listed
 Bridges Almshouses, Keynsham
 City of Wells Almshouses, Priest Row, Wells
 Gray's Almshouses, Taunton, which are Grade I listed
 Helyar Almshouses, East Coker, erected between 1640 and 1660 and now Grade II listed 
 Milward Almshouses, Keynsham
 Old Almshouse, Axbridge
 Partis College, Bath, built as large block of almshouses between 1825 and 1827, now Grade I listed
 Sexey's Hospital, Bruton,  built around 1630. The West Wing and chapel are Grade I listed. The East Wing and gateway are Grade II listed.
 St John's Hospital, Bath, which is Grade I listed
 St Margaret's Almshouses, Taunton
 William Portman Almshouses, Staple Fitzpaine, which are Grade II* listed
 Woborn Almshouses, Yeovil

Staffordshire
 Almshouses, Manor Road, Kings Bromley 
 Ash Almshouses, also called Joliffe Almshouses, Broad Street/Compton, Leek
 Bagot Almshouses, Bagot Street, Abbots Bromley 
 Condlyffe Almshouses, Condlyffe Road, Leek
 Dame Paulet's Almshouses, Burton upon Trent
 Dr Milley's Hospital, Lichfield
 Thomas Guy's Almshouses, Tamworth
 Hospital of St John Baptist without the Barrs, Lichfield
 Sir Martin Noel's Almshouses, Mill Street, Stafford (founded in 1660)
 Walter Holdnall Almshouses, Kinver

Suffolk
 The Downs Almshouses, Stoke-by-Nayland
 Dreyer Almshouses, Bungay
 The Almshouse, Wickhambrook
 Tooley's and Smart's Almshouses, Ipswich
 The Guildhall Feoffment Trust, Bury St Edmunds
 Trinity Hospital, Long Melford
 Almshouses, Peasonhall (built as one house in C16, converted into almshouses in 1891)

Surrey
 Abbot's Hospital, Guildford, founded 1619, now Grade I listed
 Margaret Ogilvie Almshouses, Thorpeness
 St Mary's Almshouses, Godstone, founded 1872
 The Victoria Almshouses, Reigate & Redhill
 Whiteley Village, Walton on Thames
 Windsor Almshouses, Farnham, built 1619

Sussex

East Sussex
 Percy and Wagner Almshouses, 1–12 Lewes Road, Hanover, Brighton; dating from 1795 and listed at Grade II.
 Watermen and Lightermen of the River Thames Almhouses, St Leonard's-on-Sea, Hastings

West Sussex

 Dyers Almshouses, Crawley (built 1939–40, 1952 and 1971)
 Sackville College, East Grinstead, built in1609 and now Grade I listed
 Humphrys Almshouses, Humphrys Road, Worthing

Warwickshire
 
 Nicholas Chamberlaine's Almshouses, Bedworth
 Gramer Cottages, including James Gramer Almshouses, Mancetter
 Guild of the Holy Cross, Church Street Almshouses, founded 1417/18 for old and needy members of the guild and in 1553 transferred to Stratford upon Avon Corporation for 24 elderly townsfolk Stratford-upon-Avon
 Emily Payne and Elizabeth Saunders Homes, Stratford-upon-Avon
 Mary Newlands Almshouses, Stratford-upon-Avon
 John Roberts Almshouses, Stratford-upon-Avon
 Lord Leycester Hospital, Warwick
 The Guild Cottages, Bowling Green Street, Warwick – seven almshouses founded in 1991 by the combined Thomas Oken & Nicholas Eyffler Charity
 The Almshouses, Castle Hill, Warwick – four almshouses founded in c16 by Nicholas Eyffler
 The Almshouses, Castle Hill, Warwick – six almshouses added to the four above, founded in c16 by Thomas Oken
 Stoneleigh Old Almshouses, Stoneleigh (founded in 1576 by Sir Thomas & Lady Alice Leigh of Stoneleigh Abbey for five unmarried men and five women)
 Widow's Charity Houses, High Street, Kenilworth (founded in 1644 for poor widows by George Denton of Warwick)
 Leamington Hastings Almshouse, Leamington Hastings (founded in 1608 for eight poor people by Humphrey Davis, schoolmaster)
 Rose Cottage, Banbury Road, Ettington, once thatched and now a private home

West Midlands

Birmingham

 Cadbury Almshouses, Mary Vale Road, Bournville
 Glovers Trust Almshouses, Chester Road, Royal Sutton Coldfield
 Harborne Parish Lands Charity, Dore House, 56a Lordswood Road, Harborne
 Harborne Parish Lands Charity, Harbourne House, Tibbetts Lane, Harborne, built 1984
 Holte & Bracebridge Almshouses, Church Road, Erdington, re-built 1930
 James Lloyd Trust, Heath Road, Bournville  new build houses
 James Memorial Cottages Almshouse, Nechells Park Road, Nechells
 Lench's Trust (est. 1525), Quinton
 Lench's Trust, Ravenhurst Cottages, Ravenhurst Street, Camp Hill
 Lench's Trust, Conybere Street, Highgate, Birmingham
 Rhodes Almshouses, Soho Road/Belgrave Terrace, Handsworth
 Walmley Almshouses, Royal Sutton Coldfield
 Elizabeth Dowell's Almshouse Trust, Moseley

Coventry

 Bond's Hospital, built in 1506 and now Grade II* listed 
 Ford's Hospital, traditionally known as Grey Friars Hospital; Grade I listed, it was founded in 1509.
 Lady Herbert's Homes (built in 1935 and 1937), Lady Herbert's Gardens, Chauntry Place
 Bond's Lodge (founded 2020 Coventry Church (Municipal) Charities Three Storey, 45 Self Contained Apartments with large Courtyard Garden), Hill Street

Dudley
 Almshouses, Church Road, Old Swinford
 Peter Harris Almshouses, Seager's Lane, Brierley Hill
 Sedgley Almshouses, Ettymore Road, Sedgley

Sandwell

 Akrill Homes, West Bromwich
 Harbourne Parish Lands Charity, almshouses around Hales Lane and Taylors Lane, Smethwick
 Henry Mitchell Almshouses (Harborne Cottages), Coopers Lane, Smethwick

Solihull
 Davenport Homes, Knowle,

Walsall
 
 Chavasse Almshouses, Lichfield Road, Rushall
 Crump's Almshouses, Eldon Street
 Harper's Almshouses, 12–14 Bath Street
 Henry Boys Almshouses, Wednesbury Road/Tasker Street 
 Marsh's Almshouses, Bath Road

Wolverhampton
 Rogers Almshouses, Church Gardens, Powell Street, Heath Town
 Sedgwick Almshouses, Pennwood Lane, Lower Penn

Worcestershire
 Burltons, Cookes and Sayers Almshouses, Bewdley

Wiltshire
 Hungerford Almshouses, Corsham, built in 1668 and now Grade I listed
 Farley Hospital, Farley (built 1681)
 Duchess of Somerset's Hospital, Froxfield (1694, 1775 and 1813)
 Hospital of St John, Heytesbury (endowed c.1472, rebuilt 1769)
 Sir James Thynne House, Longbridge Deverill (founded 1655)
 Hospital of St John, Malmesbury (13th century)
 College of Matrons, Salisbury (founded 1682)
 Topps Almshouses, Stockton (built 1657)

Yorkshire

East Yorkshire
 Almshouses, 14 College Street, Kingston-upon-Hull
 Beverley Consolidated Charity is an amalgamation of several local charities running almshouses in the town.
Historical almshouses include:
Ann Routh's, Keldgate;
Bede Houses, Lairgate;
Charles Warton's, Minster Moorgate;
Elizabeth Westoby's, Keldgate;
Ellen Kennington's, Toll Gavel;
Maisons de Dieu, Morton Lane;
almshouses, Railway Street;
William Parker's, Woodlands.

Newbuild almshouses include:
Caroline Walker's, New Walkergate;
Christopher Hobson Place, Kitchen Lane;
Citadel Court, Wilbert Lane;
Crown Mews, Hengate;
David Gray Jackson's, Cartwright Lane;
Eric Bielby Close, Railway Street;
James Arthur Smedley's, Ladygate;
Keldgate Bar, Keldgate;
Leconfield Close, Keldgate;
Porter Place, Trinity Lane.
 Linsdall's Hospital and Flanking Walls, Patrington
 Northumberland Almshouses, 150 Fountain Road, Kingston-upon-Hull
 The Charterhouse, Kingston upon Hull

North Yorkshire
 Beamsley Hospital, Beamsley, founded in 1593. The north wing is Grade I listed and the south wing is Grade II* listed.
 Fontaines Hospital, Linton
 Lady Lumley's Almshouses, Lady Lumley's School, Thornton-le-Dale
 St John's Almshouses, Ripon, which are Grade II listed
 Sir William Turner's Almshouses, Kirkleatham, Redcar

South Yorkshire
 Hollis Hospital, Sheffield. There are four accommodation blocks: East, West, Central and North West.  The four blocks were designed by Howard C Clarke and built in 1903.  Each of the four blocks is a Grade II listed building.  The east block has an inscribed slate plaque dated 1703.
 John Eaton's Almshouses, Sheffield
 Shrewsbury Hospital, Sheffield

West Yorkshire
 Ripley Ville Almshouses, Bradford (built 1881)
 Joseph Crossley's Almshouses, Halifax 
 Sir Francis Crossley's Almshouses, Halifax, built by Francis Crossley
 Waterhouse Homes, Halifax
 St Leonard's Almshouses, Horbury (built 1888)
 Nettleton's Almshouses, Northgate, Almondbury, Huddersfield (1861–63), designed by William Henry Crossland
 Saltaire Almshouses, Saltaire
 Ledsham Almshouses, Ledsham
 Harrison's Almshouses, Sandal, Wakefield

York

 Ingram's Hospital, which was built in 1630–1640 and is now Grade II* listed
 Terry Memorial Homes, Skeldergate, which were built in 1898 and are now Grade II listed.

Scotland
 Cowane's Hospital, Stirling, established in 1637 and now category A listed by Historic Environment Scotland

Wales

 Bangor Cathedral Almshouses, Bangor, Gwynedd
 Burton Almshouses, Newport
Monmouth Alms Houses, Monmouth
Powis Almshouses, Chepstow, Monmouthshire
 Queen Victoria Almshouses, Newport

Northern Ireland

 Annahilt Almshouses, Annahilt, Co Down
 Gill's Almshouses, Carrickfergus
 Seaforde Almshouses, Newcastle Road, Seaforde, Co Down 
 Sheils Almshouses, Carrickfergus

References

External links
 The Almshouse Association, representing independent almshouse charities throughout the United Kingdom
 List of English Almshouses associated with monastic institutions (from public domain text, English Monastic Life)
 Medieval Hospitals (Almshouses) of England, by Rotha Mary Clay (public domain text, including daily life, care, and the "Office at the Seclusion of a Leper")

 
Almshouses
Almshouses